Neil Ellis may refer to:

 Neil Ellis (footballer) (born 1969), English footballer
 Neil Ellis (politician) (born 1962), Canadian politician